Abraham de Broen (1759–1804)  was a Swedish actor, stage manager and  director.

Biography
Abraham Isaaksson De Broen belonged to the elite of the pioneer generation actors of the Royal Dramatic Theatre. He was also the founder and first director of the Djurgårdsteatern. He was a very popular character actor and mainly played elder male roles in so called burgher plays, often tragedies. In 1781 he was employed at the theater at Bollhuset  and was later one of leading actors  at  Royal Dramatic Theatre. 
 
In 1780, he was married to Maria Elisabet de Broen (1756-1809) and was the father of Isaac de Broen (1783-1814) and Debora Aurora de Broen (1790-1862). In 1801, De Broen was granted permission to found the Djurgårdsteatern  and serve  as its director. Abraham De Broen died on April 4, 1804 at Linköping in Östergötland County. After his death, the theater was managed first by his widow and then by their son actor  Isaac de Broen. After Isaac de Broen died in 1814, the theatre was taken over by his widow, Kristina Margareta Cederberg (1786-1858) and after that by his brother-in-law, actor Karl Wildner (1774-1844) who was  married to Debora Aurora de Broen.

References

Other sources
 Nordensvan, Georg, Svensk teater och svenska skådespelare från Gustav III till våra dagar. Förra delen, 1772-1842, Bonnier, Stockholm, 1917

1759 births
1804 deaths
18th-century Swedish male actors
Swedish theatre directors
19th-century Swedish male actors
Swedish male stage actors
19th-century theatre managers